An office chair, or desk chair, is a type of chair that is designed for use at a desk in an office. It is usually a swivel chair, with a set of wheels for mobility and adjustable height. Modern office chairs typically use a single, distinctive load bearing leg (often called a gas lift), which is positioned underneath the chair seat. Near the floor this leg spreads out into several smaller feet, which are often wheeled and called casters. Office chairs were developed around the mid-19th century as more workers spent their shifts sitting at a desk, leading to the adoption of several features not found on other chairs.

Many office activities such as writing or typing involve a forward seat position in front of a work station, emphasizing free use of the arms and hands for reaching and for dexterous activities. Other tasks, such as talking on the telephone, permit a recumbent posture. Static posture, sitting in a single position for long periods of time, places strain on the body and can lead to medical concerns. Teleconferencing, an increasing common business activity, has slightly different postural constraints as compared to typing or audio telephony. Chairs with additional adjustments, such as seat pan tilt, cater to a wider range of use cases; sometimes this is combined with a powered standing desk, to further mobilize the body. 

Chairs with castors move best on hard floors or specialized mats. The wheels concentrate the bearing load onto small contact surfaces, and can damage some types of flooring materials, such as traditional hardwood, unless protected by a suitable hard mat. Rolling and swiveling used in combination permits a single office worker to command many different desks or workstations within a small office footprint (often an office cubicle). Plush carpets are unsuitable flooring materials for wheeled chairs. Especially plastic wheels rolling over modern synthetic materials, such as carpet or a plastic floor mat, are capable of generating high level of static charge, which can be damaging to electronic devices in some cases.

History
The concept of a swiveling chair with castors was illustrated by the Nuremberg patrician Martin Löffelholz von Kolberg in his 1505 technological illuminated manuscript, the so-called Codex Löffelholz, on folio 10r. One of the earliest known innovators to have created the modern office chair was naturalist Charles Darwin, who put wheels on the chair in his study so he could get to his specimens more quickly.

With the advent of rail transport in the mid-19th century, businesses began to expand beyond the traditional model of a family business with little emphasis on administration. The additional administrative staff was required to keep up with orders, bookkeeping, and correspondence as businesses expanded their service areas. While office work was expanding, an awareness of office environments, technology, and equipment became part of the cultural focus on increasing productivity. This awareness gave rise to chairs designed specifically for these new administrative employees: office chairs. American inventor Thomas E. Warren (b. 1808), designed the Centripetal Spring Armchair in 1849 which was produced by the American Chair Company in Troy, New York. It was first presented at the 1851 Great Exhibition in London. It was only around 1850 when a group of engineers in the United States began to investigate how chairs could improve health and relaxation by stressing posture and movement. 

The office chair was strategically designed to increase the productivity of clerical employees by making it possible for them to remain sitting at their desks for long periods of time. A swiveling chair with casters allowed employees to remain sitting and yet reach a number of locations within their work area, eliminating the time and energy expended in standing. The wooden saddle seat was designed to fit and support the body of a sitting employee, and the slatted back and armrests provided additional support to increase the employee’s comfort. Like modern chairs, many of these models were somewhat adjustable to provide the maximum comfort and thus the maximum working time.

Types
There are multiple kinds of office chairs designed to suit different needs. The most basic is the task chair, which typically does not offer lumbar support or a headrest. These chairs generally cannot be sat in for more than a couple hours at a time without becoming uncomfortable, though they often offer more room to move than higher-end chairs.

Mid-back chairs offer fuller back support, and with the right ergonomic design, can be sat in for four hours at a time or longer. High-end chairs in this category, such as the Herman Miller Aeron and the Steelcase Leap are comfortable for long periods. Some mid-back chairs in particular offer customization options that can allow for a headrest to be added. 

Executive or full-back chairs offer full back and head support. Many executive chairs are designed to be sat in for eight or more hours at a time. These are typically the most expensive office chairs.

Ergonomics
In the 1970s, ergonomics became an important design consideration. Today, office chairs often have adjustable seats, armrests, backs, back supports, and heights to prevent repetitive stress injury and back pain associated with sitting for long periods.

Standards for the design and testing of office chairs include:

 EN 1335:2012
 EN 1728:2012
 ANSI/BIFMA X 5.1
 DIN EN 1335
 DIN 4551
 AS/NZS 4438

Further reading 

 Olivares, Jonathan. A Taxonomy of Office Chairs. London: Phaidon Press, 2011.

See also

Armrest
Centripetal Spring Armchair
Coccydynia
Gaming chair
List of chairs
Standing desk

References

External links
A Short History of the Birth and Growth of the American Office

Chairs
Office equipment
Ergonomics